In the first edition of the tournament, MaliVai Washington won the title by defeating Arnaud Boetsch 3–6, 6–4, 6–3 in the final.

Seeds

Draw

Finals

Top half

Bottom half

References

External links
 Official results archive (ATP)
 Official results archive (ITF)

1994 ATP Tour
1994 Singles